Swainsona stenodonta  is a plant species in the family Fabaceae, native to the north-west of Western Australia. It was first described in 1879 by Ferdinand von Mueller.

It is an annual herb, growing from 30 cm to 1 m high on stony watercourses, sandstone and plains. The flowers are brown-red, purplish or blackish and seen from July to October.

References

External links
Swainsona stenodonta occurrence data from GBIF

Angiosperms of Western Australia
stenodonta
Taxa named by Ferdinand von Mueller
Plants described in 1879